The Enid Armory was located in Enid, Oklahoma and has been listed on the National Register of Historic Places since 1988. The two-story building was constructed in 1936 as a Works Progress Administration project. It was the third largest Armory in Oklahoma.

Of the WPA-built armories in Oklahoma, the Enid Armory was the only one utilizing red brick in its construction. The Oklahoma National Guard trained soldiers for combat in World War II and Korea. In 2005, the BRAC Commission voted to close 53 state armories and build Armed Forces Reserve Centers, including one at Vance Air Force Base. The Enid Armory location was approved by city commissioners as a new site for Garfield Elementary School, and was demolished by the Enid Public School system, following the opening of the Armed Forces Reserve Center at Vance, and the removal of lead and asbestos from the site by the Oklahoma Department of Environmental Quality.
The first Enid Armory was constructed in 1925 at Phillips University.  The 189th Field Artillery Regiment of the Oklahoma National Guard was stationed at Phillips from 1921 to 1936. On July 7, 1933, Clyde and Buck Barrow  broke into the armory, stealing a cache of weapons and ammunition and a pair of binoculars. Their take was so large it filled their car, causing seating difficulty, and overflowed from the bathtub they'd used as storage.

Gallery

References

Buildings and structures in Enid, Oklahoma
Armories on the National Register of Historic Places in Oklahoma
Works Progress Administration in Oklahoma
Government buildings completed in 1936
Installations of the United States Army in Oklahoma
Art Deco architecture in Oklahoma
National Register of Historic Places in Garfield County, Oklahoma